Mapusa is a town in North Goa, India. It is situated 13 km north of the capital Panaji. The town is the headquarters of Bardez Taluka. It is located on the main highway NH-17, linking Mumbai to Kochi.

In Portuguese, the town is known as Mapuçá.

History

Mapusa is a small town clustered around the Mount (Alto). The name Mapusa is thought to be derived from the Konkani word for a 'measure' - 'map' and the phrase fill up - 'sa'. Ancient Goan agrarian community had a well established Gaunkari or Community Farming System, where villages formed associations, worked on community land and shared profits. Market day was a major event, with goods brought in from every district to one central area. Mapusa has thus remained a prominent market center for many centuries.

Geography

It has an average elevation of 15 metres (49 feet).It lies on the banks of Mapusa River.
Mapusa has a tropical climate with temperatures ranging from a high of 37 °C in summer with high levels of humidity to a low of 21 °C in winters.

Demographics

As of the 2011 Census of India, Mapusa had a population of 40,487. Males constitute 52% of the population and females 48%. Mapusa has an average literacy rate of 76%, higher than the national average of  74.04%: male literacy is 80%, and female literacy is 73%. In Mapusa, 11% of the population is under 6 years of age.

Government and politics

Civic administration
Mapusa is administered by the Mapusa Municipal Council.

Representation in Parliament and State Assembly 
At a state level, Mapusa falls within the Mapusa (Goa Assembly constituency). As of 2019, its representative in the Goa Legislative Assembly is Joshua D'Souza of the Bharatiya Janata Party.

At a national level, the city is falls within the North Goa (Lok Sabha constituency). As of 2019, its Member of Parliament is Shripad Yesso Naik of the Bharatiya Janata Party.

Economy

Mapusa is close to one of the main centres of Goa's tourism industry. Mapusa's proximity to many beaches in the north of Goa makes it a suitable base during the tourist season (November to April). Because it is a mainly commercial town (for locals) with a large resident population, Mapusa has only a limited number of hotels and accommodation.
Mapusa comes alive on Friday, the traditional market day also known as Mapusa Friday Market. People from surrounding villages and towns come to Mapusa to sell their wares. This fair has a lot of local flavour (unlike some other tourist-oriented fairs or markets) and specialises in agricultural produce, vegetables, locally grown fruit, spices, clothes and even plants (mainly during the monsoon planting season).

Every Friday, the Mapusa Market bulges at the seams, with seemingly every square inch of space occupied by sellers with only just enough room for the prospective buyers, the alleys between the regular stalls being occupied with temporary mats and boards. From lottery tickets displayed in great swathes to barber shops, the bazaar caters for almost every requirement imaginable. There is the fish street, dried fish of all possible varieties and whole fresh fish from baby shark and squid to the ubiquitous bangda (mackerel). Fresh fruit and vegetables are gathered together and beautifully displayed, from huge sweet potatoes, and pumpkins and the local shiny red brown Moira bananas to the tiny fresh beans and other pulses.

Education

Mapusa houses several prominent Goan educational institutions, including Saraswat Vidyalaya, St. Mary's Convent High School, St. Britto's High School, New Goa High School, St. Antony's High School, Mapusa High School, Dyanprasarak High School, Shree Ganesh Vidya Mandir, Dnyanprassarak Mandal's College, St. Xavier's College of Art, Science and Commerce, and St. Xavier's Higher Secondary School, Agnel Institute of Technical Education (Engg College).

Landmarks

Mapusa, however, does not have too many tourist sites. There are a few colonial era Municipal building on the Altinho hill, but it is a fairly small town with mostly modern buildings spread around the slopes of Altinho.

The most famous local shrine is Shree Dev Bodgeshwar Sansthan of Lord Bodgeshwar, located on the outskirts of the town in the middle of some rice fields, which is beautifully lit up at night and draws thousands of devotees for its annual Jatra.

The St. Jerome Church, founded in 1594 and rebuilt several times since, is famous for the annual feast of Our Lady of Miracles.

The Mapusa Market gathers Goan traders as well as merchants from adjacent states for goods such as spices, toddy and home-grown goods. For example, there are four varieties of locally grown bananas sold in this market and other varieties imported from Karnataka. There is also a part of the market where the traders specialise in repairing utensils such as blenders and food mixers for the preparation of spices.

Duler Stadium is an association football stadium located in Mapusa. The 10000 seater stadium has Astroturf surface. Goa Professional League and Santosh Trophy games are held here.

Gallery

Notable people
 Manohar Parrikar, Chief Minister of Goa, [Former Minister of Defence of India]]
 Dayanand Bandodkar, 1st Chief Minister of Goa
 Francis Dsouza, Deputy Chief Ministers of Goa
 Raj Naik, first-class cricketer
 Myron Fernandes, professional footballer
 Ramdas Kamat, Classical Singer, Performed in Marathi Sangeet Natak and theatre.
 Manohar Usgaoncar, lawyer, former Advocate General of Goa and the first Additional Solicitor General of India from Goa. 
 Surendra Sirsat, educationist and former Speaker of the Goa Legislative Assembly. 
 Ramakant Khalap, lawyer, politician, former Law Minister of India.

References

External links
Goa: A compete Guide

 
Cities and towns in North Goa district